Hugh Patrick Guarin Maule  (12 May 1873 – 15 May 1940) was a British architect whose work included the Royal Veterinary College in London opened by George VI in 1937. Between 1919 and 1923 he was Chief Architect to the Ministry of Agriculture and Fisheries and also served as architect to the trustees of the Douglas Haig Memorial Homes for Ex-Soldiers.

Early life
Henry Patrick Guarin Maule was born on 12 May 1873 at Newnham on Severn in Gloucestershire. He was the son of Augustus Henry Maule, a Gentleman, and Ellen Maule. Maule was educated at Bedford Modern School, where he was head boy, and later articled to the architectural practice of Colonel Sir Robert William Edis KBE CB.

Career

After a spell in private practice Maule was made Headmaster of the London Architectural Association School of Architecture, a position he held from 1903 to 1913. During World War I, Maule became a Major in the Honourable Artillery Company, was a recipient of the Military Cross and made a Companion of the Distinguished Service Order.

After the war, Maule was made Chief Architect to the Ministry of Agriculture and Fisheries but returned to private practice in 1923. He was architect to the trustees of the Douglas Haig Memorial Homes for Ex-Soldiers. For much of his architectural career Maule was based in London operating in partnership with William Adam Forsyth as Forsyth & Maule.

Mould's work included large additions and alterations to Kinnaird House in Perthshire and the Royal Veterinary College in London which was opened by King George VI in 1937.

Family life
In 1902 he married Edith, eldest daughter of Canon R.B. Poole DD, the headmaster of his old school. He died in Hertfordshire on 15 May 1940 and was survived by his wife, two sons and a daughter.

Two days after his obituary, a tribute to Major Maule was published in The Times on 18 May 1940: 'In everything he did he was actuated by the highest principles; and by his fine ideals, energy and keenness he inspired others.  He was a true leader of men'.

References

1873 births
1940 deaths
Companions of the Distinguished Service Order
Recipients of the Military Cross
People educated at Bedford Modern School
Honourable Artillery Company officers
British Army personnel of World War I
Fellows of the Royal Institute of British Architects
Architects from Gloucestershire
People from Newnham on Severn
20th-century English architects